Dropped may refer to:

Dropped (Consolidated album), 1998
Dropped (Mind Funk album), 1993
Dropped (TV series), a 2015 French reality series

See also
Drop (disambiguation)